The women's 100 metres hurdles event at the 2008 African Championships in Athletics was held at the Addis Ababa Stadium on April 30–May 1.

Medalists

Results

Heats
Qualification: First 3 of each heat (Q) and the next 2 fastest (q) qualified for the final.

Wind: Heat 1: +0.6 m/s, Heat 2: +0.7 m/s

Final
Wind: -0.2 m/s

References
Results (Archived)

2008 African Championships in Athletics
Sprint hurdles at the African Championships in Athletics
2008 in women's athletics